The 62nd Armored Battalion "M.O. Jero" is an inactive armored battalion of the Italian Army based in Catania in Sicily. Originally the battalion, like all Italian tank units, was part of the infantry, but since 1 June 1999 it is part of the cavalry. Operationally the battalion was last assigned to the Motorized Brigade "Aosta".

History 
The battalion was formed during the 1975 Italian army reform: on 1 October 1975 the LXII Armored Battalion of the Infantry Brigade "Aosta" was renamed 62nd Armored Battalion "M.O. Jero. The 62nd Jero was granted a new flag on 12 November 1976 by decree 846 of the President of the Italian Republic Giovanni Leone. The battalion received the traditions of the LXII Tank Battalion "L", which had been formed by the XXI Tank Battalion "L" in Italian Libya in December 1939. Equipped with L3/35 tankettes the LXII battalion fought in the early stages of the Western Desert Campaign and was destroyed by the British XIII Corps in the Battle of Bardia on 5 January 1941.

After World War II the LXII battalion was reformed in Catania on 21 February 1961 as armored unit of the Infantry Brigade "Aosta".

Tank and armored battalions created during the 1975 army reform were all named for officers, soldiers and partisans, who were posthumously awarded Italy's highest military honor the Gold Medal of Military Valour for heroism during World War II. The 62nd Tank Battalion's name commemorated 32nd Tank Infantry Regiment Second Lieutenant Fulvio Jero, who had served in the LXII Tank Battalion "L" and was killed in action on 3 January 1941 during the Battle of Bardia. Equipped with M47 Patton tanks and M113 armored personnel carriers the battalion joined the Motorized Brigade "Aosta".

After the end of the Cold War the Italian Army began to draw down its forces and on 27 August 1992 the 62nd Armored Battalion "M.O. Jero" merged with the 62nd Mechanized Infantry Battalion "Sicilia" to form the 62nd Armored Infantry Regiment "Sicilia". Afterwards the flag of the 62nd Jero was transferred to the Shrine of the Flags at the Vittoriano in Rome.

See also 
 Motorized Brigade "Aosta"

References

Tank Battalions of Italy